Enteromius tomiensis is a species of ray-finned fish in the genus Enteromius. It is endemic to the Central African Republic.

References 

 

Endemic fauna of the Central African Republic
Enteromius
Taxa named by Henry Weed Fowler
Fish described in 1936